Fofó Iosefa Fiti Sunia (born March 13, 1937) was the first non-voting Delegate from American Samoa to the United States House of Representatives. He was born in Fagasā, Pago Pago, and attended the University of Hawaii.

Sunia was the administrative officer for the Samoan affairs-liaison functions for the Governor of American Samoa, and served as a translator and interpreter and an election commissioner from 1961 to 1966. He founded the Samoan News newspaper in 1964 and became director of tourism for the Government of American Samoa in 1966, serving until 1970. Sunia was elected a territorial Senator in 1970 and was a member of the legislature until 1978. He also formerly served as president and chairman of the American Samoan Development Corporation.

Sunia was elected as a Democrat to the United States House of Representatives, and served from January 3, 1981 until his resignation on September 6, 1988, after he was indicted on federal charges of running a payroll padding scheme. He pleaded guilty and was sentenced to five to fifteen months in prison and to pay $65,000 in restitution.

He is currently a resident of Pago Pago.

Political views
As a Delegate to the U.S. Congress, Sunia opposed a Constitutional amendment which would have made English the official language of the United States. He argued that English already is the language of the U.S. and the law represented few if any changes to the status quo. He was quoted for saying: “… the 35,000 American Samoans on the island use the Samoan language in government, in the court, in business and in all facets of daily living, but strive to improve their proficiency in English.” He did not believe the proposed amendment would reward “linguistic differences as an asset.”

See also 
List of Asian Americans and Pacific Islands Americans in the United States Congress

References

External links

|-

1937 births
20th-century American politicians
American politicians convicted of fraud
American Samoa Democrats
American Samoa Senators
American translators
Delegates to the United States House of Representatives from American Samoa
Democratic Party members of the United States House of Representatives from American Samoa
Living people
Politicians convicted of conspiracy to defraud the United States
University of Hawaiʻi alumni